Ultimate Ascent was the 2013 FIRST Robotics Competition game. It is styled similarly to disc golf.

Kickoff
The Kickoff event was held on January 5, 2013. Speakers included Dean Kamen, Woodie Flowers and John Grunsfeld. It was broadcast on NASA TV beginning at 10:30 EST.

Rules

Alliances
Ultimate Ascent is played with two alliances: one red and one blue. Each alliance has three teams. During the qualification rounds at competition the matches are generated such that teams do not play two matches too quickly or compete with or against another team too often. Elimination alliances are then selected in a two-round serpentine draft by the top eight seeded teams before the elimination rounds. Each team's robot can be identified by its bumpers which must have the team's number visible from any side of the robot. The bumpers are also colored to match the alliance that the robot is on. The winning alliance is determined by the team with the most points at the conclusion of the match.

Field

Ultimate Ascent is played on a 27' x 54' field. There are two pyramids placed in the center of each half of the field. There are five scoring locations on the opposite end of the field from the alliance station where that team's drivers are. Four of the goals are located on the opposing alliance's wall. The fifth is part of the pyramid at that end of the field.

Matches

Ultimate Ascent matches are two minutes and fifteen seconds long. The first fifteen seconds are called the autonomous period. During this period the robots follow a set of pre-programmed instructions. Following this period the teams take control for the teleoperated period. Drivers control their robots, attempting to score discs into the goals at the opposite end of the playing field. The robots also can climb their alliance's pyramid at the end of the match to score additional points. In the final thirty seconds the human players can throw their six colored discs into play over the alliance wall.

Scoring

Teams start with up to 2 or 3 discs on the robot at the beginning of the match. Robots which begin touching the carpet behind their colored Auto Line may have three discs; others may have only two. They can score these in autonomous or wait for the teleoperated period.  Only the 6 discs of an alliance's color count when scored on top of its pyramid.  White or opposing colored discs will not count if scored in the pyramid. Since the human players may not put any colored discs in play until teleoperated, scoring in the pyramid is not possible in autonomous. Teams can score points as follows by scoring discs into goals:

The match ends with robots attempting to climb pyramid game elements located on the field. Robots earn points by climbing the pyramid based on how high they climb. Levels are divided by the horizontal bars on the pyramid, with from the ground to the first bar being level 1.  The following is the breakdown of the scoring:

Robots
Robots must not exceed a perimeter of 112 inches, never exceed 84 inches in height, and not exceed 60 inches in height when outside their auto zone (the area in front of and including their colored auto line). During game play the robot can not exceed a 54 in diameter cylinder. Not including the battery and protective bumpers, the robot cannot exceed a weight of 120 pounds.

Events

Regionals

Week 1

Week 2

Week 3

Week 4

Week 5

Week 6

Week 7

Districts

State/Regional Championships

World Championship

Final Round at Einstein Field
Source:

References

External links

Official game animation

FIRST Robotics Competition games
2013 in robotics
Articles containing video clips